The Epiphone Blackbird is the Epiphone Company's variant of the Gibson Thunderbird bass with a couple of differences. It still has the black hardware, a single on/off switch with no volume or tone knobs, a mahogany body with a flat-black finish, the normal Gibson Thunderbird bridge with an "opti grab" handle added, a 1.5" wide nut, and a similar (if not exactly the same) pickguard.
The only differences seem to be a hard maple bolt-on neck and the two "deepsixx" humbucker pickups.

This is the signature model of Nikki Sixx of Mötley Crüe's Thunderbird.

External links
Epiphone Blackbird– Information, and pictures of the Epiphone Blackbird.

Epiphone electric bass guitars